Quatlecoatl was an Aztec prince, son of Emperor Acamapichtli and Queen Xiuhcuetzin, half-brother of Emperors Huitzilihuitl and Itzcoatl, an uncle of Chimalpopoca and Moctezuma I.

Chimalpahin mentions this prince in his work:
"By Ahatl's daughter [was born] another son, who was named Quatlecoatl, from whom issued and descended the head men of Mexico... captains and soldiers."

Sources 

Tenochca nobility
Nobility of the Americas